Dennis William Hickey (September 20, 1844 - October 26, 1908) was a Union Army soldier in the American Civil War who received the U.S. military's highest decoration, the Medal of Honor.

Hickey was born in Troy, New York on September 20, 1844. He was awarded the Medal of Honor, for extraordinary heroism shown on June 29, 1864, while serving as a Sergeant with Company E, 2nd New York Volunteer Cavalry Regiment, at Stony Creek Bridge, Virginia. His Medal of Honor was issued on April 18, 1891.

Hickey died at the age of 64, on and was buried at Saint Georges Cemetery in Newburgh, New York.

Medal of Honor citation

References

External links

1844 births
1908 deaths
Military personnel from Troy, New York
Burials in New York (state)
People of New York (state) in the American Civil War
Union Army soldiers
United States Army Medal of Honor recipients
American Civil War recipients of the Medal of Honor